In international relations, since the late 20thcentury, the term "regional power" has been used for a sovereign state that exercises significant power within a given geographical region. States that wield unrivaled power and influence within a region of the world possess regional hegemony.

Types of countries

Characteristics 
Regional powers shape the polarity of a regional area. Typically, regional powers have capabilities which are important in the region, but do not have capabilities at a global scale. Slightly contrasting definitions differ as to what makes a regional power. The European Consortium for Political Research defines a regional power as 'a state belonging to a geographically defined region, dominating this region in economic and military terms, able to exercise hegemonic influence in the region and considerable influence on the world scale, willing to make use of power resources and recognized or even accepted as the regional leader by its neighbors.'

The German Institute of Global and Area Studies states that a regional power must:

 Form part of a definable region with its own identity
 Claim to be a regional power (self-image as a regional power)
 Exert decisive influence on the geographic extension of the region as well as on its ideological construction
 Dispose over comparatively high military, economic, demographic, political, and ideological capabilities
 Be well integrated into the region
 Define the regional security agenda to a high degree
 Be appreciated as a regional power by other powers in the region and beyond, especially by other regional powers
 Be well connected with regional and global forums

Regional powers 
In this list are states that have been described as regional powers by international relations and political science academics, analysts, or other experts. These states, to some extent, meet the criteria for regional power status, as described above. Different experts have differing views on exactly which states are regional powers. States are arranged by their region, and in alphabetical order.

Africa 
Even though the economic weight of Africa is relatively low compared to other continents, and more than two-thirds of African countries are among the least developed states in the world, Africa's rich natural resources and diverse cultures could carry the potential to enable future development.

Although South Africa was diplomatically isolated during the latter years of the apartheid era, it is considered to have successfully reintegrated into international affairs over the last 20 years. It is recognized as the only newly industrialized country in Africa and takes a crucial role in BRICS and G20. 

Nigeria, often referred to as the "Giant of Africa," due its population and economy both being the largest in Africa, and the cultural influence that it holds over other countries in Sub-Saharan Africa, through its movie industry and mass media. Nigeria is also the largest oil producer in Africa.

Nigeria, Egypt, South Africa, and Algeria are the four largest African economies; all have GDPs over $150 billion (nominal) and $500 billion (PPP) as of 2020.

Sub-Saharan Africa

Asia 
Historically, Imperial China was the dominant power in East Asia. From the late 19th century, the Empire of Japan initiated far-reaching Westernizing reforms, and rapidly industrialized, to become a major power in Asia by the time of World War I, as one of the Allied Powers. With economic turmoil, Japan's expulsion from the League of Nations, and its interest in expansion on the mainland, Japan became one of the three main Axis powers in World War II.

Since the late 20th century, regional alliances, economic progress, and contrasting military power changed the strategic and regional power balance in Asia. In recent years, a re-balancing of military and economic power among emerging powers, such as China and India, has resulted in significant changes in the geopolitics of Asia. China and Japan, being the second and third largest economic powers of the world respectively, have also gained greater influence over regions beyond Asia. In recent decades, South Korea has emerged as a significant economic and cultural power in East Asia. Japan and South Korea are important allies for the United States in the Indo-Pacific region.

East Asia

Southeast Asia

South Asia

Western Asia/Middle East

Europe 

Russia – the dominant part of a former superpower, the Soviet Union, is now considered a potential superpower, and has historically been the primary geopolitical force in Eastern Europe. France, Germany, Italy, and the United Kingdom are seen as the Big Four of Western Europe, as they play pivotal roles as part of the NATO Quint in the security of the Western Bloc. Most of the continent is now integrated as a consequence of the enlargement of the European Union, which is sometimes considered a great power as a whole, despite it not being a sovereign state. Historically, dominant powers in Europe created large global colonial empires (such as the Belgian, British, Danish, Dutch, French, German, Italian, Portuguese, Russian, and Spanish empires).

Eastern Europe

Central Europe

Western Europe

Southern Europe

North America 
The United States is the primary geopolitical force in North America, and is considered the contemporary sole superpower globally. It dominates the region so heavily that its neighbors, Canada and Mexico, both middle powers in the region, are generally not considered regional powers. Despite having a large enough economy to be a member of the G7, Canada is not a regional power for two reasons. It is militarily secure as a result of U.S. hegemony, and has become financially comfortable by its dependence on, and deep integration with, a robust U.S. economy. Mexico is an emerging power which could probably be viewed as a regional power if grouped with Latin America, or a definite regional power if considered in either Middle America or in Hispanic America due to its economic size and diverse cultural heritages. However, similar to Canada, Mexican economy is highly reliant on the U.S. with about 80% of its exports shipping to the U.S. alone.

Oceania 
Australia is considered to be a regional power due to its relative wealth within Oceania and Southeast Asia. Despite having less than a tenth of Indonesia's population, Australia has a larger GDP in nominal terms.

South America 
Since the Age of Discovery, Portugal and Spain mostly divided South America to be the foremost colonial powers in the continent, but following decolonization in the first half of the 19th century, the European powers withdrew and new nations were established, although their cultural influence and languages still remain predominant in Latin America.

Argentina is the largest Spanish-speaking country and the second-largest economic power in South America, with vast natural resources in energy and agriculture. It is a global leading food producer with large-scale agricultural and livestock industries, and a highly diversified industrial base, in comparison to many countries in the region. Brazil, on the other hand, is long considered the most compelling geopolitical power in South America, as the country has the highest population and landmass in South America, and its economic size, which possesses enormous stockpiles of natural resources, including valuable minerals, a tenth of the world's fresh water and Earth's largest remaining rainforest. Brazil has an important role in international relations, especially in economic and global environmental issues. Argentina and Brazil are both members of the G20 major economies.

Transcontinental regional powers 
Transcontinental countries such as Russia and Turkey exert regional influence over different continents.

See also 
 List of historical great powers
 List of modern great powers
 Middle power

Notes 
  Considered a great power 
  Member of AUKUS
  Member of BRICS
  Member of CIVETS
  Member of D-8
  Member of G7
  Member of G-14
  Member of G-15
  Member of G20
  Member of MIKTA
  Member of N-11
  Member of OPEC
  Member of QUAD
  Member of the Shanghai Cooperation Organisation (SCO)
  One of the G4 nations
  Permanent member of the UN Security Council

References

Bibliography 
 
 
 

20th-century neologisms
Hegemony
Political science terminology
Political terminology
International relations theory